Catherine Barclay and Martina Müller were the defending champions but Müller did not enter this year, as she competed at the Qualifying rounds of the Wimbledon Championships during the same week. Barclay teamed up with Nannie de Villiers and lost in first round to tournament runners-up Nadia Petrova and Mary Pierce.

Elena Dementieva and Lina Krasnoroutskaya won the title by defeating Nadia Petrova and Mary Pierce 2–6, 6–3, 6–4 in the final.

Seeds

Draw

Draw

References

External links
 Official results archive (ITF)
 Official results archive (WTA)

Women's Doubles
Doubles